Advanced Space Propulsion Investigation Committee (ASPIC) was a research group of specialists, including Y.Minami, and T.Musha, which was organized under the Japan Society for Aeronautical and Space Sciences in 1994. Its purpose was to study various non-chemical space propulsion systems instead of the conventional rocket for the use of space missions to near-Earth, the Moon, and the outer solar system, including plasma propulsion, laser propulsion, nuclear propulsion, solar sail and field propulsion systems  which utilize a strain on space, zero-point energy in a vacuum, electro-gravitic effect, non-Newtonian gravitic effect predicted by Einstein's general theory of relativity, and the terrestrial magnetism. The research report was published by the Japan Society for Aeronautical and Space Sciences in March 1996.

Notes

Space organizations
1994 establishments in Japan
Scientific organizations established in 1994